John David Hold (born 28 March 1948) is an English former footballer who played as a forward.

He began his career with Fareham Town before playing professionally for Bournemouth & Boscombe Athletic, Crewe Alexandra (on loan) and Northampton Town between 1965 and 1973, making a total of 131 Football League appearances.

His career continued playing non-league football at Margate and Ashford Town.

In 1975, Hold moved to Canada and played for London City. He played for four years before retiring in 1979.

References

Living people
1948 births
English footballers
Footballers from Southampton
Association football forwards
Canadian National Soccer League players
Margate F.C. players
AFC Bournemouth players
Crewe Alexandra F.C. players
Northampton Town F.C. players
Fareham Town F.C. players
Ashford United F.C. players
London City players
Toronto First Portuguese players
English expatriate footballers
English expatriate sportspeople in Canada
Expatriate soccer players in Canada